Events from the year 1529 in Sweden

Incumbents
 Monarch – Gustav I

Events

 The first Evangelical church meeting is held in Örebro, the Örebro koncilium: the customs of Holy water, Anointing and Pilgrimages (and thereby the worship of saints) is kept, and the priests are offered but not forced to accept the bible in the native language. However, fasting and the celibacy of vicars is abolished. 
 Dissolution of Gudhem Abbey.
 April - The king sister Margareta Eriksdotter Vasa is captured and the Westrogothian rebellion takes place, with the purpose to deposed the king in protest of the Reformation.
 The former nuns of the Askeby Abbey are forcibly moved to Vreta Abbey.

Births

 - Laurentius Petri Gothus,  the second Swedish Lutheran Archbishop of Uppsala (died 1579)  
 - Ebba Månsdotter (Lilliehöök), countess and county administrator (died 1609)

Deaths

References

 
Years of the 16th century in Sweden
Sweden